Awkward is the first studio album by British hip hop musician Ty. It was released on Big Dada in 2001. It peaked at number 40 on the UK Independent Albums Chart.

Critical reception
Kieran Wyatt of CMJ New Music Monthly said: "The album title says it all really: Ty openly displays his uncomfortable relationship with himself, his music and the people around him and in doing so, comes through with an album that is bursting with honesty."

Track listing

Charts

References

External links
 

2001 debut albums
Ty (rapper) albums
Big Dada albums